The 2014 Vaahteraliiga season was the 35th season of the highest level of American football in Finland. The preseason took place between May 10 and May 25 and was followed by the regular season between June 16 and August 31, 2014. The Finnish champion was determined in the playoffs and at the championship game Vaahteramalja XXXV the Helsinki Roosters won the Turku Trojans.

Standings

Playoffs

References

American football in Finland
Vaahteraliiga
Vaahteraliiga